Himalayan Meditation and Yoga Sadhana Mandir is a Hindu temple located in the Seocho district of Seoul metropolitan city. It is an affiliate center of Association of Himalayan Yoga Meditation Societies International organisation in South Korea. The temple offers various classes and training programs on different Meditation and Yoga practices to the local Hindu and Korean communities. The temples maintains various centers across the Korean peninsula.

See also
 Buddhism in Korea
 Hinduism in Korea
 Indians in Korea
 Koreans in India
 Korean Shamanism
 Memorial of Heo Hwang-ok, Ayodhya 
 India–South Korea relations
 India – North Korea relations
 List of Hindu temples in South Korea
 List of Hindu temples outside India
 Silk Road transmission of Buddhism

References

Lists of religious buildings and structures in South Korea
Hindu temples in South Korea